Wayne Richard Embry (born March 26, 1937) is a retired American basketball player and basketball executive. Embry's 11-year playing career as a center spanned from 1958 to 1969 playing for the Cincinnati Royals, Boston Celtics and Milwaukee Bucks, all of the National Basketball Association (NBA). After his playing career, Embry transitioned to a career as a professional basketball executive, becoming the first African-American general manager and team president in NBA history.

Since 2004, Embry has served as a senior basketball advisor for the Toronto Raptors.

Early life
Embry attended Tecumseh High School near New Carlisle, Ohio, where he was a three-year letter winner and earned Honorable Mention All-State honors.

College career
Embry went to Miami University in Oxford, Ohio, where he became a member of Alpha Phi Alpha fraternity.

As a two-time all-Mid-American Conference center, Embry, a team captain, led the then-Redskins to conference championships and NCAA Tournament appearances in 1957 and 1958. He led the MAC in scoring and rebounding in two seasons and still holds several school records, including best career rebounding average (15.5). He ranks among Miami leaders in the all-time scoring list with 1,401 points and rebounding list with 1,117. He holds both Miami and MAC records for most rebounds in a game (34) and season (488). During his career, he was one of only 10 players in MAC history to total more than 1,000 career points and rebounds.

He was selected to the Helms Athletic Foundation All-America third team as a senior, and he was a two-time honorable mention All-America selection in 1957 and 1958.

He was inducted in the second class of the Miami Athletics Hall of Fame in 1970. He became the fourth player in Miami history to have his jersey (23) retired.

Embry earned a Bachelor of Science in education from Miami.

NBA playing career
Embry was originally drafted by the St. Louis Hawks in 1958. He was then traded closer to home weeks later to the Cincinnati Royals. The Royals were rebuilding due to the collapse of the team following the head-injury-related hospitalization of team star Maurice Stokes. Star center Clyde Lovellette was traded to St. Louis for Embry and four others.

Oscar Robertson arrived to the team in 1960, reviving the Royals. Embry, Robertson and Jack Twyman were all NBA All-Stars for Cincinnati over the next three years. Embry's play was notable for his pick and roll play with Robertson, whose encouragement improved Embry's game. A powerful 6'8" and 240 pounds, Embry at times appeared to be a blocker on the court, a protector of teammates.

In 1963, he was named team captain of the Royals. During the 1963 NBA Playoffs, Embry averaged postseason career highs of 16.8 points and 13.5 rebounds per game. The next season, 1963–64 Cincinnati Royals surged to the second-best record in the NBA, with teammate Jerry Lucas now added. That season, on December 1, Embry totaled a career high 39 points scored in a 114-109 loss to the Los Angeles Lakers. However, the team was never able to surpass the Boston Celtics of Red Auerbach and Bill Russell, or the Philadelphia 76ers with Wilt Chamberlain in their quest for an NBA title.

Nearly retiring to be a regional sales leader for Pepsi-Cola, Embry was talked out of retirement by friend Bill Russell, the new player/coach for Boston. Embry played crucial reserve minutes for Russell and aided that team's surprising 1967–68 NBA title run.

That offseason, when the Milwaukee Bucks were formed, they claimed Embry from the Celtics in the expansion draft, and Embry started at center for the Bucks for the 1968–69 season. In the first game in Bucks franchise history, Embry scored 15 points and grabbed 20 rebounds. Embry retired at the end of the season.

NBA career statistics

Regular season

|-
| align="left" | 1958–59
| align="left" | Cincinnati
| 66 || - || 24.1 || .387 || - || .656 || 9.0 || 1.5 || - || - || 11.4
|-
| align="left" | 1959–60
| align="left" | Cincinnati
| 73 || - || 21.8 || .439 || - || .514 || 9.5 || 1.1 || - || - || 10.6
|-
| align="left" | 1960–61
| align="left" | Cincinnati
| style="background:#cfecec;"| 79* || - || 28.3 || .451 || - || .668 || 10.9 || 1.6 || - || - || 14.4
|-
| align="left" | 1961–62
| align="left" | Cincinnati
| 75 || - || 35.0 || .466 || - || .690 || 13.0 || 2.4 || - || - || 19.8
|-
| align="left" | 1962–63
| align="left" | Cincinnati
| 76 || - || 33.0 || .458 || - || .667 || 12.3 || 2.3 || - || - || 18.6
|-
| align="left" | 1963–64
| align="left" | Cincinnati
| 80 || - || 36.4 || .458 || - || .650 || 11.6 || 1.4 || - || - || 17.3
|-
| align="left" | 1964–65
| align="left" | Cincinnati
| 74 || - || 30.3 || .456 || - || .644 || 10.0 || 1.2 || - || - || 12.7
|-
| align="left" | 1965–66
| align="left" | Cincinnati
| style="background:#cfecec;"| 80* || - || 23.5 || .411 || - || .603 || 6.6 || 1.0 || - || - || 7.6
|-
| align="left" | 1966–67
| align="left" | Boston
| 72 || - || 10.1 || .409 || - || .569 || 4.1 || 0.6 || - || - || 5.2
|-
| style="text-align:left;background:#afe6ba;" | 1967–68†
| align="left" | Boston
| 78 || - || 13.9 || .400 || - || .589 || 4.1 || 0.7 || - || - || 6.3
|-
| align="left" | 1968–69
| align="left" | Milwaukee
| 78 || - || 30.2 || .427 || - || .664 || 8.6 || 1.9 || - || - || 13.1
|- class="sortbottom"
| style="text-align:center;" colspan="2"| Career
| 831 || - || 26.2 || .440 || - || .640 || 9.1 || 1.4 || - || - || 12.5
|}

Playoffs

|-
| align="left" | 1961–62
| align="left" | Cincinnati
| 4 || - || 32.0 || .467 || - || .778 || 11.3 || 2.0 || - || - || 14.0
|-
| align="left" | 1962–63
| align="left" | Cincinnati
| 12 || - || 32.8 || .450 || - || .662 || 13.5 || 1.3 || - || - || 16.8
|-
| align="left" | 1963–64
| align="left" | Cincinnati
| 10 || - || 36.3 || .381 || - || .622 || 12.4 || 2.1 || - || - || 13.4
|-
| align="left" | 1964–65
| align="left" | Cincinnati
| 4 || - || 30.8 || .438 || - || .818 || 6.3 || 2.0 || - || - || 12.8
|-
| align="left" | 1965–66
| align="left" | Cincinnati
| 5 || - || 27.8 || .421 || - || .583 || 6.8 || 0.4 || - || - || 7.8
|-
| align="left" | 1966–67
| align="left" | Boston
| 5 || - || 7.6 || .387 || - || .500 || 2.6 || 0.6 || - || - || 5.2
|-
| style="text-align:left;background:#afe6ba;" | 1967–68†
| align="left" | Boston
| 16 || - || 10.1 || .390 || - || .448 || 2.8 || 0.4 || - || - || 3.7
|- class="sortbottom"
| style="text-align:center;" colspan="2"| Career
| 56 || - || 24.1 || .418 || - || .645 || 8.0 || 1.1 || - || - || 10.1
|}

NBA front-office career
Embry later became an assistant manager for the Bucks, keeping an eye for former Royals teammates he could lure to the rising contender. He was instrumental in numerous signings to aid the team, including Robertson. His remarkable teaming with then-named Lew Alcindor quickly produced an NBA title, with Embry by then rising into Milwaukee's front office.

After retiring as a player he became the first African-American NBA general manager, managing the Milwaukee Bucks (1972–1979), Cleveland Cavaliers (1986–1999), and Toronto Raptors (2006). He was selected NBA Executive of the Year in 1992 and 1998.

In 2004, Embry was hired to be the senior basketball advisor to Rob Babcock, the rookie general manager for the Toronto Raptors. After one season, Embry was elevated from senior advisor to president, bypassing Babcock in the chain of command when the board cited a lack of confidence in Babcock's moves. On January 26, 2006, Embry was named the interim general manager for the Raptors after the firing of Babcock, a position he held for two months until Bryan Colangelo was hired as the general manager. Embry has continued to serve as senior basketball advisor for the Raptors. Since then, the Raptors went on to become NBA champions in 2019.

Personal life and legacy
Embry and his wife Terri have two daughters and one son. He also has a granddaughter. He is distantly related to Marty Embry, another professional basketball player.

He has been a founder and CEO of his own businesses, and member of numerous nonprofit and corporate boards of directors, including Kohl's, Federal Reserve Bank of Cleveland, Centerior Energy and Ohio Casualty Insurance.

He is the author of an autobiography The Inside Game: Race, Power and Politics in the NBA (University of Akron Press, 2004), with Mary Schmitt Boyer of the Cleveland Plain Dealer.

Embry has been a trustee of the Naismith Memorial Basketball Hall of Fame since 1974 and has served on various senior-level committees for the NBA and USA Basketball. In recognition of his career both on the court and in the front office, he was inducted into the Naismith Hall of Fame as a contributor to the sport in 1999. He also served as a member of Miami's Board of Trustees for 14 years, including one year as chair.

Embry was inducted into the Ohio Basketball Hall of Fame in 2006 as a member of the charter class. He was the 2013 recipient of the Ohio Heritage Award, recognizing an Ohio Basketball Hall of Fame inductee for his or her contributions to the state of Ohio off the court.

A portion of US Route 40 in front of Tecumseh High School near Springfield, Ohio was named in Wayne Embry's honor.

On May 18, 2021, Miami University unveiled a statue which stands at the south entrance of Millett Hall, the university's basketball arena. It captures Embry’s likeness and signature hook shot. Private donations funded the creation of the statue and a Wayne Embry Scholarship, which will support Miami varsity men’s basketball student-athletes. The university also presented Embry and his late wife, Theresa “Terri” Embry (Miami ’60), with the Freedom Summer of ’64 Award, which is bestowed each year upon a distinguished leader who has inspired the nation to advance civil rights and social justice.

References

External links
 
 Wayne Embry's Ohio Basketball Hall of Fame Enshrinement Speech.
Wayne Embry's Miami University statue dedication and Freedom of '64 Award Ceremony

 Toronto Raptors profile
Embry interview in 1973 AFVN radio aircheck

1937 births
Living people
African-American basketball players
African-American sports executives and administrators
American expatriate basketball people in Canada
American men's basketball players
American sports executives and administrators
Basketball players from Ohio
Boston Celtics players
Centers (basketball)
Cincinnati Royals players
Cleveland Cavaliers executives
Miami RedHawks men's basketball players
Milwaukee Bucks executives
Milwaukee Bucks expansion draft picks
Milwaukee Bucks players
Naismith Memorial Basketball Hall of Fame inductees
National Basketball Association All-Stars
National Basketball Association general managers
National Collegiate Basketball Hall of Fame inductees
Power forwards (basketball)
Sportspeople from Springfield, Ohio
St. Louis Hawks draft picks
Toronto Raptors executives
21st-century African-American people
20th-century African-American sportspeople